Dušan Grabrijan (1899–1952) was a Slovenian-Bosnian architect, architectural theorist and professor.

Grabrijan was a student of Jože Plečnik. In Ljubljana, he is known for example by the monument to Slovene Modernist poets Ivan Cankar, Dragotin Kette, and Josip Murn at Žale. He came to Sarajevo in 1930; there, he spent 20 years of his life working on purpose of architectural improvement of Sarajevo city. Also he worked as professor at Secondary Technical School in Sarajevo, where during the thirties he published number of works. 

One of the field which most attracted him were Oriental House, adopted to the demand of Bosnian culture.

References

External links 
 Dušan Grabrijan

1899 births
1952 deaths
Slovenian architects
Bosnia and Herzegovina architects
Yugoslav architects